Aryankuzhi is a residential area in Thiruvananthapuram, Kerala, India. It is just 3 kilometres away from the heart of Trivandrum city.

Places near by Aryankuzhi
Kamaleswaram (1 km), Manacaud (1 km), Kallattumukku (1 km), Chenthitta (1 km) are the nearby localities to Aryankuzhi.

Location
Aryankuzhi is 3 km from the city centre. Privately owned and Kerala State Road Transport Corporation buses plying in the Kovalam route from East Fort pass through Kamaleswaram. A bypass of National Highway 47 passes 1 km to the west of Aryankuzhi. The nearest railway station is Thiruvananthapuram Central, 3 km away. The nearest airport is Thiruvananthapuram International Airport, 4 km away. It is also near Kamaleswaram, which is a bustling residential region situated on the way from East Fort to Thiruvallam, in Thiruvananthapuram. The 2000-year-old Thiruvallam Sree Parasurama Temple at Thiruvallam is about 5 km from Aryankuzhi.

Religion
The population of Aryankuzhi mainly practices Hinduism and Islam. The place is famous for the presence of Aryankuzhi Devi Temple.

Religious Places
 Aryankuzhi Devi Temple
 Aryankuzhi Ganapathy Temple
 Aryankuzhi Hanuman Temple

Government offices near Aryankuzhi
 Govt. Kamaleshwaram Higher Secondary School
 Harbour Engineering Department
 Department of Fisheries
 Muttathara Village Office

References

Suburbs of Thiruvananthapuram